Year 1349 (MCCCXLIX) was a common year starting on Thursday (link will display the full calendar) of the Julian calendar.

Events
January–December
 January 22 – An earthquake affects L'Aquila in southern Italy with a maximum Mercalli intensity of X (Extreme), causing severe damage, and leaving 2,000 dead.
 February 14 – Jewish persecutions during the Black Death: Strasbourg massacre – Because they are believed by the residents to be the cause of the Black Death, roughly 2,000 Jews are burned to death.
 February 19 – Jewish persecutions during the Black Death: The entire Jewish community in the remote German village of Saulgau is wiped out.
 March 21 – Jewish persecutions during the Black Death: Erfurt massacre – The Jewish community of Erfurt (Germany) is murdered and expelled in a pogrom.
 March 27 – An earthquake in England strikes Meaux Abbey.
 May – The Black Death ceases in Ireland.
 May 28 – In Breslau, Silesia, 60 Jews are murdered following a disastrous fire which destroys part of the city.
 August 24 – The Black Death breaks out in Elbing (Poland).
 September 9 – 1349 Apennine earthquakes. An earthquake in Rome causes extensive damage, including the collapse of the southern exterior facade of the Colosseum.
 October 20 – Pope Clement VI publishes a papal bull that condemns the Flagellants.
 November 8 – Ibn Battuta arrives in Fez, Morocco.
 November 17 – Pope Clement VI annuls the marriage of William Montacute, 2nd Earl of Salisbury, and Joan of Kent, on the grounds of her prior marriage to Thomas Holland, 1st Earl of Kent.
 December 22 – The rise of Alexios III of Trebizond to the throne ends the Trapezuntine Civil Wars.

Ongoing
 The Black Death in England spreads to the north and a ship from England carries it to Askøy and Bjørgvin (modern-day Bergen) in Norway. The disease also breaks out in Mecca and is prevalent in the Île-de-France and the Kingdom of Navarre.

Births 
 September 9 – Duke Albert III of Austria (d. 1395)
 date unknown
 Friar John, Minister of the Friars Preachers of Ireland (alive 1405)
 Venerable Macarius of Yellow Lake and Unzha, semi-legendary Russian saint (d. 1444)

Deaths 
 February 26 – Fatima bint al-Ahmar, Nasrid princess in the Emirate of Granada (b. c.1260)
 April 3 – Eudes IV, Duke of Burgundy (b. 1295)
 May 31 – Thomas Wake, English politician (b. 1297)
 June – John Clyn, Irish Franciscan friar and chronicler
 June 14 – Günther von Schwarzburg, German king (b. 1304)
 August 26 – Thomas Bradwardine, Archbishop of Canterbury
 September 11 – Bonne of Luxembourg, queen of John II of France (b. 1315)
 September 30 – Richard Rolle, English religious writer (b. c.1300)
 October 6 – Joan II of Navarre, daughter of Louis X of France (b. 1311)
 October 25 – James III of Majorca (b. 1315)
 November 18 – Frederick II, Margrave of Meissen (b. 1310)
 date unknown – Hamdallah Mustawfi, Persian historian and geographer (b. 1281)
 probable – William of Ockham, English philosopher (b. 1285)

References